At the 1998 Goodwill Games, the athletics events were held at the Mitchel Athletic Complex in Uniondale, New York, United States from 19 to 22 July. The programme consisted of 44 track and field events, of which 22 were contested by male athletes and 22 by female athletes. With the introduction of the women's hammer throw and mile run, the men's and women's programmes achieved equivalent parity for the first time. The United States topped the athletics medal table for a third consecutive edition winning 17 gold medals and 55 medals in total. Russia were the next best performing nation, with 11 golds and 21 medals. Kenya, Cuba and Jamaica rounded out the top-five countries.

As in previous editions, the competition was by invitation only and events were contested in a single final format. Significant prize money was available to athletes, with some event winners receiving US$40,000, and world record breaking performances were worth $120,000. One world record was broken at the competition – an American team comprising Jerome Young, Antonio Pettigrew, Tyree Washington and Michael Johnson improved the 4×400 metres relay record. Sixteen Goodwill Games records were set over the course of the four-day competition. Athletes from the USA filled the podium in five separate events: the women's heptathlon and the men's 400 m, 110 metres hurdles, 400 metres hurdles and shot put.

Marion Jones won the women's 100 metres and 200 metres in Games record time, beating Zhanna Pintusevich on both occasions. Jackie Joyner-Kersee won a fourth consecutive heptathlon title at the Goodwill Games in what was the last competitive outing of her career. Jearl Miles Clark took two silver medals in the 400 metres and 800 metres. Tyree Washington won 200 and 400 m silvers before breaking the world record in the relay. Dan O'Brien, completing his first decathlon since his 1996 Olympic gold, won the event with a games record score.

Records

Note: The IAAF announced on 12 August 2008 that they had rescinded this record after Antonio Pettigrew admitted to using human growth hormone and EPO between 1997 and 2003. Jerome Young tested positive for performance-enhancing drugs in 2004.

Medal summary

Men

Women

Medal table

Participation

References

Results
Goodwill Games. GBR Athletics. Retrieved on 2010-06-29.
Athletics results. Goodwill Games. Retrieved on 2010-06-29.

External links
Official website

1998 Goodwill Games
1998
Goodwill Games
International track and field competitions hosted by the United States